Gestrin is a surname. Notable people with the surname include:

Christina Gestrin (born 1967), Finnish politician
Kristian Gestrin (1929–1990), Finnish judge and politician
Terry Gestrin, American politician